This page lists public opinion polls conducted for the 2012 French presidential election, which was held on 22 April 2012 with a run-off on 6 May 2012.

Unless otherwise noted, all polls listed below are compliant with the regulations of the national polling commission (Commission nationale des sondages) and utilize the quota method.

First round 
Starting on 12 January 2012, Ifop-Fiducial published a "rolling" poll for Paris Match and Europe 1 which is listed in the tables below as "Ifop-Fiducial" without an asterisk, while separate polls not conducted as part of the "rolling" poll are listed with an asterisk (*). Polls conducted specifically for subsample data are listed with two asterisks (**).

The publication of first-round polls was prohibited after midnight on 20 April 2012.

Graphical summary 
The averages in the graphs below were constructed using polls listed below conducted by the eight major French pollsters. The graphs are smoothed 14-day weighted moving averages, using only the most recent poll conducted by any given pollster within that range (each poll weighted based on recency).

Jean-Pierre Chevènement of the Citizen and Republican Movement (MRC) withdrew his candidacy on 1 February 2012 after failing to secure significant support. Christine Boutin of the Christian Democratic Party (PCD) renounced her candidacy on 13 February and announced her support for Nicolas Sarkozy, as did Hervé Morin of the New Centre (NC) on 16 February, followed by Frédéric Nihous for Hunting, Fishing, Nature and Traditions (CPNT) on 22 February. On 15 March, Dominique de Villepin of United Republic (RS) announced that he would not secure enough sponsorships to become a candidate "barring a republican miracle", effectively ending his campaign, and Corinne Lepage of Cap21 was absent from the official list of candidates published on 19 March, having also failed to secure at least 500 sponsorships.

Official campaign

17 October 2011 to 19 March 2012

8 July to 16 October 2011

13 May to 7 July 2011

28 February to 12 May 2011

20 August 2010 to 27 February 2011

29 October 2009 to 19 August 2010

31 October 2007 to 28 October 2009

By region 
Corsica

Réunion

French residents overseas

By commune 
Aubagne

Second round 
Starting on 12 January 2012, Ifop-Fiducial published a "rolling" poll for Paris Match and Europe 1 which is listed in the tables below as "Ifop-Fiducial" without an asterisk, while separate polls not conducted as part of the "rolling" poll are listed with an asterisk (*). Polls conducted specifically for subsample data are listed with two asterisks (**).

The publication of second-round polls was prohibited after midnight on 4 May 2012.

Graphical summary 
The averages in the graphs below were constructed using polls listed below conducted by the eight major French pollsters. The graphs are 14-day weighted moving averages, using only the most recent poll conducted by any given pollster within that range (each poll weighted based on recency).

Hollande–Sarkozy

By first round vote

By region 
Corsica

Réunion

French residents overseas

By commune 
Aubagne

Aubry–Sarkozy

Royal–Sarkozy

Strauss-Kahn–Sarkozy

Sarkozy–Le Pen

Hollande–Le Pen

Aubry–Le Pen

Strauss-Kahn–Le Pen

Aubry–Fillon

Strauss-Kahn–Fillon

Delanoë–Sarkozy

Bayrou–Sarkozy

See also 
Opinion polling for the French legislative election, 2012
Opinion polling for the French presidential election, 2002
Opinion polling for the French presidential election, 2007
Opinion polling for the French presidential election, 2017

References 

2012 French presidential election
Opinion polling in France
France